People's Writer of Azerbaijan (Azerbaijani: Xalq yazıçısı) is the honorary title granted to the distinguished writers of Azerbaijan for their contribution to the development of Azerbaijani literature.

Assignment 
The honorary title "People's Writer of Azerbaijan" was established by Decree of the President of the Republic of Azerbaijan dated May 22, 1998, along with some other titles.

The President of Azerbaijan confers the honorary title on his initiative, as well as on the proposal of the National Assembly and the Cabinet of Ministers.

The title is awarded only to citizens of Azerbaijan. According to the decree, the honorary title of "People's Writer of Azerbaijan" cannot be awarded to the same person repeatedly.

A person awarded an honorary title may be deprived of the title in case of misconduct.

Persons awarded the honorary title "People's Writer of Azerbaijan" also receive a certificate and a badge of the honorary title of the Republic of Azerbaijan. The badge of honor is worn on the right side of the chest.

People's Writers of Azerbaijan 

 Anar Rzayev
 Huseyn Ibragimov
 Yusif Samadoghlu 
 Magsud Ibrahimbeyov
 Rustam Ibragimbeyov
 Huseyn Abaszadeh
 Elchin Efendiyev
 Gulhuseyn Huseynoglu
 Isa Huseynov
 Elmira Akhundova
 Chingiz Abdullayev
 Ilyas Afandiyev
 Mirza Ibrahimov
 Aziza Jafarzadeh
 Suleyman Rahimov

See also 
 Orders, decorations, and medals of Azerbaijan
 People's Writer

References 

Honorary titles of Azerbaijan